Bernard Williams was an Anglican priest. He was the son of the Rev. Henry Williams (1844–?). Bernard was born on 14 December 1869 at Croxton, Norfolk. He went to school at Bury St Edmunds and Norwich.  He matriculated in 1889.

Williams was admitted to Christ's College, Cambridge on 4 April 1889 and graduated B.A. 1892 and  M.A. 1898.

He was ordained deacon at Exeter in 1899 and priest in 1899.  He served  curacies at Chittlehampton, Devon (1899-1902) and at Indwe, Diocese of Grahamstown, (1902-6).  His further career included:

 Priest Vicar of Grahamstown Cathedral, 1906–8.
 Priest-in-charge of St Saviour's, East London, 1908–14.
 Rector of East London, 1914–16.
 Dean, Archdeacon, and Rector of the Grahamstown Cathedral 1916–27.
 Vicar General of Grahamstown, 1920–7.
 Provost and Vicar of Portsmouth, 1927–30.
 Rural Dean of Portsmouth, 1928–30.
 Honorary Canon of Portsmouth, 1928–35.
 Rector of Buriton, Hampshire, 1930–5.

He died in Pietermaritzburg in 1943.

References 

1869 births
1943 deaths
Alumni of Christ's College, Cambridge
Anglican archdeacons in Africa
Deans of Grahamstown
Provosts and Deans of Portsmouth